Adam Morton  (1945 – 2020) was a Canadian philosopher. Morton's work focused on how we understand one another's behaviour in everyday life, with an emphasis on the role mutual intelligibility plays in cooperative activity. He also wrote on ethics, decision-making, philosophy of language and epistemology. His later work concerned our vocabulary for evaluating and monitoring our thinking. Morton was Professor of Philosophy from 1980 to 2000 at the University of Bristol in the UK and finished his academic career at the University of British Columbia. He was president of the Aristotelian Society during 1998–1999 and in 2006 was elected a Fellow of the Royal Society of Canada.

Works
Morton authored Frames of Mind: Constraints on the Common Sense Conception of the Mental (1980), Disasters and Dilemmas: Strategies for Real-life Decision Making (1990), The Importance of Being Understood: Folk Psychology as Ethics (2002), On Evil (2005), Bounded Thinking: Intellectual Virtues for Limited Agents (2012), Emotion and Imagination (2013), and two textbooks, A Guide Through the Theory of Knowledge (2002) and Philosophy in Practice (2003). Along with Stephen P. Stich, he co-edited Benacerraf and His Critics (1997).

References

External links
 
 Key Philosophers in Conversation: Adam Morton (1999)

1945 births
20th-century Canadian philosophers
21st-century Canadian philosophers
Academics of the University of Bristol
Canadian expatriate academics in the United Kingdom
Canadian philosophers
Canadian people of Armenian descent
Epistemologists
Fellows of the Royal Society of Canada
2020 deaths
McGill University alumni
Philosophers of language
Philosophers of mathematics
Philosophers of mind
Presidents of the Aristotelian Society
Princeton University alumni
Princeton University faculty
Academic staff of the University of Alberta
University of Oklahoma faculty
Academic staff of the University of Ottawa
Presidents of the Canadian Philosophical Association